Drepaninae are by far the largest subfamily of the Drepanidae moths. While it is usually split into two tribes, Drepanini and Oretini, its internal systematics and phylogeny are not well resolved.

Systematics
The following list is provisional and probably incomplete.

Tribe Drepanini Meyrick, 1895
 Agnidra - includes Zanclalbara
 Argodrepana
 Auzata - includes Gonocilix
 Auzatellodes
 Canucha - includes Campylopteryx
 Drapetodes
 Drepana
 Euphalacra - includes Ectothyris, Neophalacra
 Hyalospectra
 Leucoblepsis
 Macrocilix
 Nordstromia - includes Allodrepana
 Strepsigonia - includes Monurodes
 Tridrepana - includes Konjikia
Tribe Nidarini
 Nidara
Tribe Oretini Inoue, 1962
 Amphitorna - includes Neoreta, Procampsis, Tomocerota
 Astatochroa
 Oreta - includes Dryopteris, Holoreta, Hypsomadius, Mimoreta, Oretella, Psiloreta, Rhamphoreta
 Spectroreta
 Urogonodes
Unplaced to tribe

References 
 
 , 2011: Description of Sabra harpagula euroista Park, ssp. n. from Korea (Lepidoptera: Drepanidae). Shilap Revista de Entomologia 39 (156): 345-350.
 , 1960: One new species and one new subspecies of Macrauzata from Japan and China (Lepidoptera: Drepanidae). Tinea 5 (2): 314-316.
 , 2014: A new species of Callidrepana Felder, 1861 (Lepidoptera: Drepanidae) from Hainan, China. Tinea 22(5): 316-317.
 , 2002: Cilix hispanica sp. n., a new species of Drepanidae from the Ibero-balearic fauna (Lepidoptera: Drepanidae: Drepaninae). Boletin Sociedad Entomológica Aragonesa 30: 33-36. Full article: .
 , 2011: A review of the genus Oreta Walker in Korea, with description of a new species (Lepidoptera: Drepanidae). Journal of Asia-Pacific Entomology 14 (3): 311-316.
 , 2012: An annotated list of Drepaninae of the Philippines (Lepidoptera: Drepanidae). Tinea 22 (2): 107-119.

 
Moth subfamilies